The Thin Mercury Sound is the second album by Caviar. It was released July 27, 2004. Vocalist/Guitarist Blake Smith claimed the album would be reminiscent of bands such as Joy Division, New Order, and the Cure.

Track listing
 "Aloha" – 3:23
 "Clean Getaway" – 4:18
 "Lioness" – 3:42
 "Hey Let Go" – 4:24
 "You've Got a Black Black Heart" – 4:18
 "On the DL" – 3:49
 "Last of the Gold" – 4:32
 "Tiny Cannibal Bites" – 3:08
 "666" – 3:46
 "Deep Down I'm Shallow" – 3:48
 "Where Are You_" – 3:40
 "Light Up the Sky" – 3:29
 "10% November" – 4:02
 "Ego Trippin'" – 3:25
 "Last Rays of the Sun" – 4:20

Credits
 Logo, logo design – Brock Manke
 Main performer – Caviar
 Art direction, photography – Chris Strong
 Guest appearance – Christiaan Webb
 Mastering – Howie Weinberg
 Drums – Jason Batchko
 Assistant, assistant engineer – Luke Tierney
 Assisnant, assistant engineer – Mark Ralston
 Bass Guitar, Keyboards, mixing, producer – Mike Willison
 Vocals, Lyrics, Guitar, producer – Blake Smith
 Engineer, guest appearance – Neal Ostrovsky
 Engineer, guest appearance – Paul David Hager
 Engineer – Rob Ruccia
 Assistant, assistant engineer – Scott Guitierrez
 Guitar – Dave Suh
 Guest Artist – Scott Lucas
 Guest Artist – Tamar Berk

Caviar (band) albums
2004 albums